Crypsitricha roseata is a species of moth in the family Tineidae. It was described by Edward Meyrick in 1914. This species is endemic to New Zealand.

The wingspan is 7–8 mm. The forewings are ochreous-whitish, irrorated with pale grey, with some scattered black scales, as well as three black spots on the costa, margined beneath with brownish-ochreous, the first at one-fourth, connected with the base by a costal line of black irroration, others before the middle and at two-thirds. There is a small light brownish-ochreous spot beneath the middle of the disc, connected with the dorsum by a group of black scales. There is also a group of black scales on the tornus, and a small pale-ochreous spot near the termen beyond it. The hindwings are grey.

References

Moths described in 1914
Tineidae
Moths of New Zealand
Endemic fauna of New Zealand
Taxa named by Edward Meyrick
Endemic moths of New Zealand